Mbay, or Sara Mbay, is a Bongo–Bagirmi language of Chad and the Central African Republic.

It is reported that Mbay does not have independent personal pronouns. The meaning is largely carried out by subject, object, and possessive affixes attached to verbs, prepositions, and nouns. Other words, such as yá̰a̰ "thing", dèē "person", tàa "speech", and lòo "place" are used somewhat pronominally as something, somebody, something said, and somewhere.

References
The Sara-Bagirmi Language Project -- Mbay

Bongo–Bagirmi languages